James Woodson Bates (August 25, 1788 – December 26, 1846) was an American lawyer and statesman from Sebastian County, Arkansas. He represented the Arkansas Territory as a delegate to the United States House of Representatives.

Early life and education
James was born in Goochland County, Virginia at his parents' plantation known as Belmont. Part of a political family, Bates was the younger brother of Frederick Bates, second governor of Missouri; and older brother of Edward Bates, who served as US Attorney General to President Abraham Lincoln. He was the ninth child of Thomas and Caroline (Woodson) Bates. He started his advanced education at Yale University but soon transferred to Princeton University, where he graduated in 1807. He read law and then went west.

Career
In 1807, Bates' older brother Frederick was Secretary of the Missouri Territory, based in St. Louis. James and his younger brother Edward joined Frederick in St. Louis, where James began the practice of law (Edward would follow him in this profession).

When the Arkansas Territory was created in 1819, Bates moved to its capital, Arkansas Post, to become one of the first lawyers in the new territory. That fall he was elected to be the non-voting delegate for the territory in the United States House of Representatives. He served two terms, from December 21, 1819 until March 3, 1823, and chose not to stand for re-election in 1822.

While serving in Congress, he had moved to the small settlement called Poke Bayou. When the town plat was laid out in 1821, it was renamed Batesville in his honor.  When his congressional term ended, he returned to Batesville and resumed practicing law. He became a local judge in 1824, riding the fourth circuit through the western part of the territory.

In 1828 President John Quincy Adams appointed him to the superior court of the territory. Bates served until President Jackson named judge Charles S. Bibb to the post. In 1835 he was a delegate to the constitutional convention for the new state of Arkansas.

While serving as a circuit judge, Bates met a wealthy widow, Elizabeth Moore. After they married, he moved to her Moore Farm near Van Buren in Crawford County. He later served as a probate court judge and a registrar in the land office. He owned slaves.

Death
Bates died in Van Buren, Arkansas, on December 26, 1846. He is interred at a private family graveyard on the Moore farm near Van Buren.

References

External links

1788 births
1846 deaths
People from Goochland County, Virginia
American people of English descent
Delegates to the United States House of Representatives from Arkansas Territory
Arkansas state court judges
Arkansas lawyers
Missouri lawyers
American lawyers admitted to the practice of law by reading law
American slave owners
People from Batesville, Arkansas
19th-century American politicians
19th-century American judges
19th-century American lawyers
Princeton University alumni